See:

 Simpson's rule, a method of numerical integration
 Simpson's rules (ship stability)
 Simpson–Kramer method